Atherina lopeziana is a species of marine fish of the family Atherinidae. This pelagic-neritic fish grows to 8.0 cm maximal length. Widespread in the eastern Atlantic, it occurs in the Gulf of Guinea to the Bight of Bonny and offshore archipelago and is registered near Cape Verde.

References

Fish of the Atlantic Ocean
Fish described in 1961
lopeziana
Fauna of Cameroon
Fish of West Africa
Fauna of Equatorial Guinea
Fauna of Gabon
Fauna of Nigeria
Fauna of São Tomé and Príncipe